Olga Konkova (born 25 August 1969) is a Norwegian–Russian jazz pianist known from several recordings and collaboration with jazz musicians such as Adam Nussbaum, Gary Husband and Karin Krog.

Career 
Konkova was educated as classical pianist in Moscow, and later as jazz pianist at Berklee College of Music in Boston, where she met her husband, the bassist Per Mathisen. After moving with him to Oslo in 1994, she collaborated with Inge Stangvik Quartet and the "Storeslem Big Band". In her own Olga Konkova Trio she collaborates with her husband on bass and various drummers (Adam Nussbaum/Stein Inge Brækhus/Gary Husband). She has also collaborated within "Sernet Å Fyre" and Norske Store Orkester. Konkova has also contributed to album releases and performances with artists like Finn Hauge, Magni Wentzel (Porty & Bess), Roy Nikolaisen (Roy's choice), Øystein Sunde ("Øystein Sunde... og vel så det", 2002) and Hans Mathisen (Quiet Songs).

Honors 
2005: Spellemannprisen in the category Jazz, with Hans Mathisen, for the album Quiet Songs
2013: Gammleng-prisen in the category Jazz

Discography

As leader/co-leader

Collaborations 
With Finn Hauge
1998: Close to My Heart (Hot Club Records), including with Terje Gewelt and Frank Jakobsen

With Magni Wentzel
2000: Porgy and Bess (Hot Club Records), performing music by George Gershwin within sextet including Nils Jansen, Christian Jaksjø, Carl Morten Iversen and Espen Rud

With Roy Nikolaisen
2003: Roy's choice (Gemini Music)

With Hans Mathisen
2005: Quiet Songs (Curling Legs), awarded Spellemannprisen 2005
2011: Timeless Tales (Curling Legs), including with Per Mathisen and Andreas Bye

With Helge Sunde and Ensemble Denada
2006: Denada (ACT Music), featuring Olga Konkova and Marilyn Mazur
2009: Finding Nymo (ACT Music).
2013: Windfall (Ocella Records)

References

External links 
Olga Konkova Here comes the sun on YouTube
I Remember April – Felix Peikli 4tet on YouTube

20th-century Norwegian pianists
21st-century Norwegian pianists
Norwegian jazz pianists
Norwegian jazz composers
Russian pianists
Russian women pianists
Curling Legs artists
Candid Records artists
Losen Records artists
Alessa Records artists
Spellemannprisen winners
Musicians from Moscow
1969 births
Living people
Ensemble Denada members
20th-century women pianists
21st-century women pianists